Donald Ellis (5 October 1917 – 4 September 2001) was an Australian cricketer. He played one first-class match for Tasmania in 1945/46.

See also
 List of Tasmanian representative cricketers

References

External links
 

1917 births
2001 deaths
Australian cricketers
Tasmania cricketers
Cricketers from Launceston, Tasmania